Pachner is a German surname. Notable people with the surname include:

Lukas Pachner (born  1991), Austrian snowboarder
Paul Pachner (1871–1937), Austro–Hungarian admiral
Valerie Pachner (born 1987), Austrian actress
William Pachner (1915–2017), Czech-born American painter

See also 
Pachner moves, are also called bistellar flips (Geometric topology)

German-language surnames